Nadezhdiella cantori is a species of beetle from family Cerambycidae. The species are of black colour.

References

Cerambycini
Beetles described in 1845